Liechtenstein competed at the 1992 Summer Paralympics in Barcelona, Spain. 3 competitors from Liechtenstein won no medals and so did not place in the medal table. Peter Frommelt, Jamod Nemeth and Christoph Sommer were all Table Tennis players who all competed in various Men's Open and Singles events. Frommelt and Nemeth also took part in the Men's Team 9 event finishing third in their group behind the eventual finalists Italy (silver) and Japan (gold).

See also 
 Liechtenstein at the Paralympics
 Liechtenstein at the 1992 Summer Olympics

References 

Nations at the 1992 Summer Paralympics
1992
Summer Paralympics